Busovača is a town and municipality located in Central Bosnia Canton of the Federation of Bosnia and Herzegovina, an entity of Bosnia and Herzegovina.

History
During the Croat–Bosniak War, the city saw heavy fighting between the Bosnian Army and the Croatian Defence Council. Busovača, with its small economy and infrastructure, is  becoming an important crossroad between bigger cities.

Demographics

1971
14.428 total
 Croats - 7,646 (53%)
 Bosniaks - 5,896 (40.9%)
 Serbs - 735 (5.1%)
 Yugoslavs - 60 (0.4%)
 others - 91 (0.65%)

1991
18.879 total

 Croats - 9,093 (48.1%)
 Bosniaks - 8,451 (44.8%)
 Serbs - 623 (3.3%)
 Yugoslavs - 510 (2.7%)
 Others - 202 (1%)

2013
17.910 total

 Croats - 8,873 (49.5%)
 Bosniaks - 8,681 (48.5%)
 Serbs - 205 (1.1%)
 Others - 151 (0.8%)

Settlements
• Bare
• Bukovci
• Buselji
• Busovača
• Carica
• Dobraljevo
• Dolac
• Donja Rovna
• Gornja Rovna
• Grablje
• Granice
• Gusti Grab
• Hozanovići
• Hrasno
• Javor
• Jazvine
• Jelinak
• Kaćuni
• Kaonik
• Katići
• Kovačevac
• Krčevine
• Krvavičići
• Kula
• Kupres
• Lončari
• Mehurići
• Merdani
• Mihaljevići
• Milavice
• Nezirovići
• Očehnići
• Oselište
• Podbare
• Podjele
• Podstijena
• Polje
• Prosje
• Putiš
• Ravan
• Skradno
• Solakovići
• Strane
• Stubica
• Šudine
• Turići 
• Zarače

References

External links

 Official website
 Radio-Busovaca website

Cities and towns in the Federation of Bosnia and Herzegovina
 
Populated places in Busovača
Famous persons: Mirnesa Bešlić